Maria Cerra (May 17, 1918 – January 24, 2015) was an American fencer. She competed in the women's individual foil event at the 1948 Summer Olympics.

References

External links
 

1918 births
2015 deaths
American female foil fencers
Olympic fencers of the United States
Fencers at the 1948 Summer Olympics
Sportspeople from New York City
21st-century American women